Louisiana Chicago & Alton Railroad Depot, also known as the II Central Gulf, Burlington Northern, Gateway Western Railway Depot, is a historic train station located at Louisiana, Pike County, Missouri. It was built in 1907-1908 by the Chicago & Alton Railroad, and is a one-story, Mission Revival style red brick and stucco building.  The rectangular building has a gable on hip roof with projected eaves and exposed wooden roof rafter. The depot continued to operate until 1967.

It was listed on the National Register of Historic Places in 2006.

References

Former Chicago and Alton Railroad stations
Former railway stations in Missouri
Railway stations on the National Register of Historic Places in Missouri
Mission Revival architecture in Missouri
Railway stations in the United States opened in 1908
National Register of Historic Places in Pike County, Missouri
Railway stations closed in 1967